Peter Cellier (born 12 July 1928) is an English actor who has appeared on film, stage and television. He is known for his role as Sir Frank Gordon in Yes Minister and then Yes, Prime Minister in the 1980s.

Early life
Cellier was born in Hendon, Middlesex, into a family of actors including his father Frank, his mother Phyllis Shannaw, and his half-sister Antoinette. His grandfather was the Gilbert and Sullivan conductor François Cellier.

Career

Theatre
Cellier started his career at the Leatherhead Theatre in 1953. His theatre work has included seasons at Stratford-on-Avon, The Old Vic and the Chichester Festival Theatre, and he was a founder-member of the National Theatre. Shakespeare plays in which Cellier has appeared include Hamlet, The Merchant of Venice, Othello, Love's Labour's Lost, Measure for Measure, As You Like It, King John, Julius Caesar, Cymbeline and Henry V, as the Dauphin. Other roles include Pinchard in Georges Feydeau's An Absolute Turkey, Tommy Devon in Aunt Edwina, The Dean of Archeo in Body and Soul, Eric Shelding in The Case in Question, Danforth in The Crucible, Duke Francis in The Dark Horse, Dr. Finache in Jacques Charon's National Theatre production of Feydeau's A Flea in her Ear, Charles Blutham in Juno and the Paycock, Dr. Herdal in The Master Builder, Sir John Tremaine in Me And My Girl, The Chaplain in Mother Courage, Christopher in A Private Matter, Captain Brazen in The Recruiting Officer (replacing Laurence Olivier), Polonius in Rosencrantz and Guildenstern Are Dead Higgins in Ross, Miguel Estete in The Royal Hunt of the Sun and Desmond in The Winslow Boy.

Television
On television, Cellier has appeared in a wide range of programmes since 1955, including detective series such as Softly, Softly and Bergerac, adventure series such as Doctor Who, historical dramas such as The Six Wives of Henry VIII, Upstairs, Downstairs and The Duchess of Duke Street, and is perhaps best known for his work in two John Mortimer series, Rumpole of the Bailey (in which he played the role of Sir Frank Fawcett, Permanent Secretary for Defence), Paradise Postponed. He also appeared in the sitcoms It Ain't Half Hot Mum, Yes Minister and its sequel Yes, Prime Minister (1981–87) and Keeping Up Appearances, as Major Wilton-Smythe (1990–91), among others. In the two Minister series, he played Sir Frank Gordon, the Permanent Secretary to HM Treasury, urbanely contending with Nigel Hawthorne's Sir Humphrey Appleby for supremacy within the civil service. He played Roy Difford in the Casualty episode "The Silence of Friends", and the Judge in BBC Four's Canoe Man (2010), which recounted the John Darwin disappearance case.

Films
Cellier's film work includes Morgan! (1966), as Second Counsel; Young Winston (1972), as Captain 35th Sikhs; Luther (1973), as the Prior; Don't Just Lie There, Say Something! (1973), as the Attorney General; Man About the House (1974), as Morris Pluthero; Man Friday (1975), as Carey; Barry Lyndon (1975), as Sir Richard; Sister Dora (1977), as Actor; Jabberwocky (1977), as First merchant; Crossed Swords (1977), as Mean Man; Holocaust 2000 (1977), as Sheckley; The Pumaman (1980), as Martin; Breaking Glass (1980), as Garage Customer; Chariots of Fire (1981), as Head Waiter, as Savoy; And the Ship Sails On (1983), as Sir Reginald J. Dongby; The Last Days of Pompeii (1984), as Calenus; A Room with a View (1985), as Sir Harry Otway, a landlord; Clockwise (1986), as Headmaster; Out of Order (1987), as Home Secretary; Personal Services (1987), as Mr. Marples; Howards End (1992), as Colonel Fussell; Bhaji on the Beach (1993), as Ambrose Waddington; The Remains of the Day (1993), as Sir Leonard Bax; Stanley's Dragon (1994), as Mr. Johnson; Mrs Dalloway (1997), as Lord Lezham; and Ladies in Lavender (2004), as BBC Announcer.

Cellier played W. S. Gilbert in the 1983 film The Best of Gilbert and Sullivan, in which Gilbert and Sullivan reunite to watch a performance of their greatest songs at the Royal Albert Hall.

Filmography

References

External links

Peter Cellier at the British Film Institute
Peter Cellier (Aveleyman)
Curriculum vitae
Peter Cellier at Theatricalia

Cellier family
1928 births
Living people
English male film actors
English male stage actors
English male television actors
English people of French descent
20th-century English male actors
21st-century English male actors
People from Hendon